Karine Auclair is a professor of chemistry at McGill University in Montréal, Canada. She is the current Canada Research Chair in Antimicrobials and Green Enzymes.

Education and career
Auclair completed a Bachelor of Science in chemistry at Université du Québec à Chicoutimi in 1994, followed by a Doctor of Philosophy (Ph.D.) in organic chemistry at the University of Alberta in 1999. She then completed a post-doctoral fellowship in pharmaceutical chemistry at the University of California, San Francisco from 1999 to 2001.

Auclair began her teaching and research career at McGill University in 2002 as an assistant professor of chemistry. She has been a full professor since 2016.

Selected publications

References

Academic staff of McGill University
Université du Québec à Chicoutimi alumni
University of Alberta alumni
University of California, San Francisco alumni
Canada Research Chairs
Living people
Year of birth missing (living people)
Canadian women scientists